Hellinsia lumbaquia is a moth of the family Pterophoridae. It is found in Ecuador.

The wingspan is 15–16 mm. The forewings are pale brown and the markings are dark brown. The hindwings and fringes are pale brown. Adults are on wing in March, at an altitude of 850 meters.

Etymology
The species is named after the collecting site: Lumbaqui, in Ecuador.

References

Moths described in 2011
lumbaquia
Moths of South America